AISSMS (All India Shri Shivaji Memorial Society's) College of Engineering is a private engineering college located in Pune, Maharashtra, India. The college is affiliated with the University of Pune and was founded by Chhatrapati Shri Shahu Maharaj of Kolhapur, leading to the college's establishment in 1992. The institute is located close to the Regional Transport Office and shares its campus with a pharmacy college, Polytechnic and business school. At present, AISSMS offers bachelor's degrees in eight branches of engineering:       NAAC- A+ (3.27 CGPA) & *NBA ACCREDITATION*
 Chemical Engineering
 Civil Engineering
 Computer Engineering
 Electrical Engineering
 Electronics Engineering
 Mechanical Engineering
 Mechanical Engineering (Sandwich)
 Production Engineering (Sandwich)
 Robotics and Automation (starting year 2022)

The college has an annual intake of 660 students for the under graduate course and an intake of 126 students for the post graduate course.

Location and campus
AISSMS CoE is located in the heart of the city in the area of Shivajinagar, near R.T.O, around 5 minutes' walk from the Pune railway station, and is easily accessible from all parts of the city. The college is located on 11 acres (45,000 m2) of land and boasts a large ground on campus which is used for various sports competitions, parades and events.

Departments 
Chemical Engineering: National Board of Accreditation has accredited the B.E. Chemical Engineering program for two years starting from Sept., 2013. University of Pune has also awarded permanent affiliation status for the UG program recently - which was started in 1996. M.E. in Chemical Engineering program was started in the year of 2011-12 to cater to the demand of Industry and R & D establishments.

Civil Engineering: Bachelor's Degree in Civil Engineering was started in 2002, with intake of 60 students and additional intake of 60 students in 2012. M.E. in Structures was started 2011 with intake of 18 students.

Computer Engineering: B.E. in Computer Engineering is provisionally accredited by National Board of Accreditation (NBA), New Delhi. The course was started in the year 1998 with an intake of 120 Students.

Electrical Engineering: The department offers a  B.E. program in "Electrical Engineering" since 1992 and a Post Graduate program M.E. in "Power Electronics and Drives" under affiliation with University of Pune.

Electronics Engineering: The course leading to a bachelor's degree in Electronics Engineering was started in the year 1992 with an intake of 60. The department has also started Post Graduate Program in Electronics and Telecommunication in Microwave (M.E.) having an intake of 18.

Mechanical Engineering: Undergraduate course for Bachelor in Mechanical Engineering (B.E.) was started in 1992 with an intake of 60 students and additional intake of 60 students in 2012. A post graduate course in Automotive Engineering (M.E.) was started in 2010, while M.E. in Design Engineering was started in 2013 - both courses have an intake of 18 students.

Mechanical Engineering (Sandwich): B.E. in Mechanical Engineering (Sandwich) course was started in 1994 with an intake of 60 students. This course includes six semester of classroom training and two semesters of industrial training.

Production Engineering (Sandwich): The course leading to a bachelor's degree in Production Engineering was started in the year 1994 with an intake of 60. This course includes six semester of classroom training and two semesters of industrial training.

College and student activities
Engineering Today (ET): A technical event Engineering Today (AISSMS ET) is organized every year on Engineer's Day (15 September). Engineering students from all over the country exhibit their talent by participating in various competitions, viz. poster, paper, project, quiz, robotics, programming, model making, debate, design and workshop. In the event, around 30 technical competitions are organized in collaboration with the industry, which sponsors the awards for the competitors.

Ashwamedh: Every year, an annual event Ashwamedh is organized at the educational complex. Engineering students from all over state exhibit their talent by participating in various cultural and sports competitions, viz. Dance, Singing, Band, Photography, One-Act Play, Football, Basketball, Kabaddi, Chess, Table-Tennis, Badminton, etc.

Shivanjali: An annual Social Gathering and Excellence Award Ceremony, Shivanjali, is organized. The students whose performance is excellent in various activities like academic, co-curricular, cultural and sports are awarded with trophy and certificate during the ceremony. Various entertainment programs are organized by the students.

Shivaji Trophy: It is a State level Inter-Collegiate T-20 Cricket tournament, held on the occasion of Shivaji Jayanti at the educational complex.

Inter-collegiate competitions: University of Pune, Pune City Zonal Sports committee organizes various Inter-collegiate sports. The college students participate in the events like Athletics, handball, Football, Volleyball, Table-tennis, Badminton, Kho – Kho etc. at various Inter-Collegiate, Inter-Zonal, Inter-University, State level and National level competition. Students of the institute have earned applauds in the competitions at University, State and National level - the prominent one's are Verve, Vedant, Purushottam Karandak, Firodiya Karandak, Crescendo, Milanze, Zest, Versatalia, MIT Summit, Sakal Karandak, Sarpotdar Karandak, etc.

Blood donation camp and health checkup: Since the last sixteen years, blood donation camp is held in the premises of the AISSMS College of Engineering, in association with Armed Forces Medical College, Pune (AFMC) and Sassoon Hospital. The blood donation camp is organized on the occasion of Teacher's Day (5 September) by the General Student Association Committee (GSA). Health Check Camp for students, teaching and non-teaching staff is also conducted.

SAE Collegiate Club: Under Society of Automotive Engineers (SAE), India - the college team, Resonance Racing, has participated and won at various national and international events like BAJA  and SUPRA.

References

External links
 AISSMS College of Engineering
 AISSMS College of Pharmacy
 AISSMS Organization Home page
 AISSMS Institute of Information Technology

All India Council for Technical Education
Colleges affiliated to Savitribai Phule Pune University
Monuments and memorials to Shivaji
Educational institutions established in 1992
1992 establishments in Maharashtra
Engineering colleges in Pune